Mazra in Iran may refer to:

Mazra, Ahar, East Azerbaijan Province
Mazra, Shabestar, East Azerbaijan Province
Mazra, Hamadan
Mazra, Markazi